Shas is a Haredi religious political party in Israel. Founded in 1984 under the leadership of Rabbi Ovadia Yosef, a former Israeli Sephardi chief rabbi, who remained its spiritual leader until his death in October 2013, it primarily represents the interests of Sephardic and Mizrahi Haredi Jews. The party works to end discrimination against the Sephardic and Mizrahi community and highlights economic issues, religious laws and social justice.

Originally a small ethnic political group, Shas currently is the fourth-largest party in the Knesset. Since 1984 it has been part of most governing coalitions, whether the ruling party was Labor or Likud.

Name
The party was originally called Shom'rei Torah ("Guardians of the Torah"), with the acronym ש״ת, pronounced "Shat" or "Shas". However, Israeli election law requires a party wishing to use letters for their acronym that already appear in the acronym of an existing party to first obtain permission from that party, and the Israeli Labor Party, whose letters are אמת, refused to grant Shas permission to use the ת. Instead, it was named ש״ס, Shas, an acronym for Shomrei S'farad, meaning "Sephardic Guardians". The name is also a reference to the six orders (Shisha S'darim) of the Mishnah and the Talmud, both of which are often referred to by the same acronym, "Shas". The party's legal name is "Hit'akhdut ha-S'pharadim ha-Olamit Shom'rei Torah" (התאחדות הספרדים העולמית שומרי תורה), meaning "International Union of the Sepharadim, Guardians of the Torah".

History

Shas was founded in 1984, prior to the elections to the eleventh Knesset in the same year, in protest over the small representation of Sephardim in the largely Ashkenazi Agudat Yisrael, through the merger of regional lists established in 1983. It was originally known as Worldwide Sephardic Association of Torah Keepers (Hitahdut HaSfaradim HaOlamit Shomrei Torah). The party was formed under the leadership of former Israeli Chief Sephardi Rabbi Ovadia Yosef, who established a four-member (including himself) Council of Torah Sages and remained the party's spiritual leader until his death. In founding the party, Yosef received strategic help and guidance from Rabbi Elazar Shach, leader of Israel's non-Hasidic Haredi Ashkenazi Jews. Yosef founded the party in 1984 on the platform of a return to religion and as a counter to an establishment dominated by Ashkenazi Jews of European extraction.

Not all Shas voters are themselves ultra-Orthodox. Many of its voters are Modern Orthodox and traditional Mizrahi and Sephardi Jews, due to its alignment with the promotion of an "authentic Middle Eastern" Israeli culture, which fits with traditional Zionist beliefs of a revival of authentic, non-Europeanized Jewish culture. However, it still represents the Sephardi and Mizrahi Haredi Jewish sectors in the Knesset. Shas has at times been able to exert disproportionate influence by gaining control of the balance of power in the Knesset within the context of the traditionally narrow margin between Israel's large parties. Like its Labor Zionist counterparts (i. e., Labor and Meretz) that gain votes from the kibbutz movement, Shas gains votes and supports from moshavim that are inhabited by Mizrahi and Sephardi Jews, either Orthodox or non-Orthodox. Also, since it became a member of the World Zionist Organization, it gains votes from Orthodox settlers in the West Bank.

In the elections to the eleventh Knesset in 1984, Shas won four seats. Following Aryeh Deri's conviction on corruption charges in 1999, Shas gained 17 seats in the 1999 elections, its strongest showing since its formation. Although 26 seats were projected for the following election had it run in 2001, Shas was reduced to 11 seats in the 2003 election because the two-ballot system was amended.

In the 2006 elections, it gained one more seat, after running what the BBC called "an aggressive campaign that targeted the neo-conservative economic policies of the previous government", and joined Ehud Olmert's coalition government, alongside Kadima, Labor, Gil and, between October 2006 and January 2008, Yisrael Beiteinu. In the government, Shas party leader Yishai was Minister of Industry, Trade and Labor and Deputy Prime Minister, while Ariel Atias was Minister of Communications and Meshulam Nahari and Yitzhak Cohen were Ministers without Portfolio.

Following the 2009 elections, in which Shas won eleven seats, it joined Benjamin Netanyahu's coalition government and held four cabinet posts. Eli Yishai, who led the party at that time, was one of four Deputy Prime Ministers and Minister of Internal Affairs.

On 4 December 2011, Shas launched its United States affiliate, American Friends of Shas, based in Brooklyn, New York.

Shas won 11 seats in the 2013 elections, but chose to form part of the Labor opposition to Netanyahu's new government. Yair Lapid of the Yesh Atid party and Naftali Bennett of The Jewish Home, who had won more seats and joined the coalition, both favored conscription of the previously exempt Haredi men into Israel's national service and a reduction in state financial support for Haredi families, policies Shas opposes.

In December 2014, Eli Yishai left the Shas party, which he had led for more than a decade. He said he would lead a new religious party in the election scheduled for March 2015. His departure from Shas and Aryeh Deri did not come as a surprise. The party that he formed, Yachad, failed to pass the election threshold.

In the 2015 elections, Shas was accused of tampering with the ballots of Yachad. They were also accused of creating a straw party with the symbols of Otzma Yehudit, which was running on a joint list with Yachad during the election. During the 2015 election, Shas won 7 seats.

In 2017, opinion polling showed that Shas was falling under the election threshold of 3.25%. In response, Shas leader said that there was a coup attempt in the party. In the same year, a tape was leaked of the party's former spiritual leader, criticizing Jerusalem Chief Rabbi Shlomo Amar.

On 17 April 2020, a senior Likud minister, speaking on anonymity, told Al-Monitor that Deri was mediating the political coalition talks between Netanyahu and Blue and White leader Benny Gantz. It was also reported that Deri "might even be open to a new alliance with Blue and White – now that its anti-clerical component, Yair Lapid, quit the party and went his own way" and would only commit to remaining with Netanyahu's coalition until the next election.

Ideology

The stated purpose of the party is to "return the crown to the former glory", meaning to protect the religious and cultural heritage of Sephardic Jewry and to rectify what it sees as the "continued economic and social discrimination against the Sephardic population of Israel". Focusing on the needs of Sephardic Orthodox Israelis, Shas established its own government-funded religious education system called MaAyan HaHinuch HaTorani, which became popular in poor Sephardic towns, increasing the party's popular support.

Shas advocates for the increased influence of Halakha, the Jewish religious law, in Israeli society and actively engages in the Baal teshuva movement, encouraging non-Orthodox Israelis of Sephardic and Mizrahi-Jewish heritage to adopt an Orthodox Jewish lifestyle. Shas is a Haredi religious party, but it has participated in left-wing governments and is often willing to compromise on both religious and economic issues.

At first, Shas followed a moderate policy on the Israeli–Palestinian conflict, after Yosef had declared that lives were more important than territories, but it has since moved to the right and opposes any freeze in Israeli settlement activity in the West Bank. In addition, it was skeptical towards the U.S. Obama Administration's intentions regarding the Israeli–Palestinian peace process and has begun to support a consolidation of Israeli settlement interests, especially regarding yeshivas and Jewish holy sites in the West Bank. It further believes in a "United Jerusalem" and supports the Greater Jerusalem plan. In 2010, Shas joined the World Zionist Organization, having made significant changes to its charter.

One of Shas's demands is a compensation package for Sephardi and Mizrahi Jews who were forced to flee their home countries and leave their property behind. Shas opposes any form of public expression of homosexuality, including Gay Pride parades, especially in Jerusalem. Shas MK Nissim Ze'ev accused the homosexual community of "carrying out the self-destruction of Israeli society and the Jewish people", calling homosexuals "a plague as toxic as bird flu". However, the party condemns any form of violence against gay people.

Controversies
Several Shas MKs, including Aryeh Deri, Rafael Pinhasi, Yair Levy, Ofer Hugi and Yair Peretz, have been convicted of criminal offenses that include fraud and forgery. In addition, MK Shlomo Benizri was convicted of bribery, conspiring to commit a crime and obstruction of justice on 1 April 2008. Benizri resigned, and Mazor Bahaina, number thirteen on the Shas list, replaced him. In 1999, Deri was sentenced to prison time on corruption charges.

In 2010, Ovadia Yosef cursed the Palestinians as "evil, bitter enemies of Israel" and said that, "Abu Mazen and all these evil people should perish from this world. God should strike them with a plague." Saeb Erekat of the PLO said Yosef's remarks were tantamount to a call for "genocide against Palestinians". Yosef later apologized and wrote to Egyptian President Hosni Mubarak: "I support your efforts and praise all the leaders and the peoples — Egyptians, Jordanians and Palestinians — who are partners and wish the success of this important process of achieving peace in our region, and preventing bloodshed. May God grant you longevity and may you succeed in your efforts for peace and may there be peace in our region." Previously, Yosef had called Arabs "vipers" and called for Israel to "annihilate" them. "It is forbidden to be merciful to them. You must send missiles to them and annihilate them. They are evil and damnable." A spokesman later clarified that his comments were only aimed at murderers and terrorists and not the entire Arab world.

In 2020, the party was fined ₪7,500 by the Central Elections Committee for giving out prayer cards at polling stations during the 2020 Knesset elections, which were claimed to cure "Corona and every illness and pestilence".

Women's campaign
Women activists protested the lack of female representation in Shas by organizing a "No Female Candidate, No Female Vote" campaign. The women said they would not vote for a party that does not include women candidates on its slate and sent an open letter to the Knesset representatives of ultra-Orthodox parties, which was also circulated on social media. Rabbi Mordechai Blau, a senior party member, threatened that women participating in the movement or bucking the party leadership would find their children "banned from Haredi schools" and their employers "boycotted by the community". Shas announced that it would create a women's council within the movement, a step that was welcomed by the campaigners. At the same time, they said: "We will move forward and call on the Haredi factions to enable women to serve as MKs in the Knesset." Eli Yishai said on Israel Radio: "There is nothing in Jewish law that says you can't have a woman as a Knesset member. But our rabbis decide what they decide on every subject and the same goes for this."

When a group of ultra-Orthodox women created their own party, U'Bizchutan, Isaac Bezalel, the Shas spokesman, said: "The Haredi public is not yet open to women serving in the Knesset."

Knesset members

Eleven individuals serve as members of the Knesset for Shas in the twenty-fifth Knesset:

Aryeh Deri
Ya'akov Margi
Yoav Ben-Tzur
Michael Malchieli
Haim Biton
Moshe Arbel
Yinon Azulai
Moshe Abutbul
Uriel Buso
Yosef Taieb
Avraham Betzalel

Party leaders

Election results

References

External links
 
Shas Knesset website

 
Ovadia Yosef
Rabai Shech
Haredi Judaism in Israel
Orthodox Jewish political parties
Sephardi Jewish culture in Israel
Political parties established in 1984
Mizrahi Jewish culture in Israel
Conservative parties in Israel
Social conservative parties
1984 establishments in Israel
Right-wing politics in Israel
Political parties in Israel